I Dreamed We Fell Apart is the full-length debut by Memphis, released in 2004 on Paper Bag Records.

Track listings
All tracks written by Torquil Campbell and Chris Dumont, except "Love Comes Quickly", by Chris Lowe and Neil Tennant.

"The Second Summer" (3:41)
"For Anyone Eighteen" (3:38)
"Into the Wild" (3:28) 
"3:15 on the Last Day of School" (3:24) 
"Hey Mister, Are You Awake?" (2:14) 
"East Van" (5:35)
"The Nootka Chimes" (0:58) 
"Nada" (3:41) 
"Love Comes Quickly" (4:41) 
"Lullaby for a Girlfriend (or Happy Trails)" (2:54)
"Voicemail" (2:59)

References

Memphis (band) albums
2004 albums
Paper Bag Records albums